WNPT, virtual channel 8 (VHF digital channel 7), is a PBS member television station licensed to Nashville, Tennessee, United States. The station is owned by Nashville Public Television, Inc., a community-funded, non-profit organization. WNPT's studios are located on Rains Avenue in southeast Nashville, and its transmitter is located in the southern suburb of Forest Hills.

History
The station signed on the air on September 10, 1962, as WDCN-TV (for "Davidson County/Nashville"), on VHF channel 2. It is Tennessee's second-oldest educational television station, behind WKNO-TV in Memphis, established six years earlier in 1956. It was originally licensed to the board of Nashville Public Schools, which became an arm of the metropolitan government when Nashville and Davidson County merged in 1963. Like most eventual PBS member stations, WDCN was mainly established to serve area school children with educational programming. The -TV suffix was dropped in 1983.

In the early 1970s, WDCN agreed to swap channel frequencies with ABC affiliate WSIX-TV, which was seeking a stronger signal. Metro agreed to trade frequencies upon realizing that WDCN's core audience would be better served on channel 8, despite its limited reach (the channel 8 transmitter facility in Nashville was short-spaced to fellow PBS station WGTV in Atlanta).

On December 11, 1973, WSIX-TV changed its call letters to WNGE-TV (now WKRN-TV) and moved to channel 2, while WDCN moved to channel 8.  It was only the third time in U.S. television history that the FCC allowed two established stations to exchange frequencies; an almost identical trade occurred in New Orleans three years earlier in 1970, also involving the ABC and PBS stations in the market.

The channel 8 signal was more or less unviewable in several areas of the market's eastern fringe, such as Cookeville. This area is slightly more rugged than the rest of Middle Tennessee, and the channel 8 signal was not able to penetrate it as well as the channel 2 signal could.  Much of this area was left without PBS programming until WCTE signed on in 1978.

Originally, the station broadcast from a building located near Belmont College (now Belmont University) on 15th and Compton Avenues, a facility shared with WSM-TV (channel 4, now WSMV) until 1963. The proceeds from the exchange of channel positions with then-WSIX/WNGE owners General Electric enabled WDCN-TV to build studios in 1976 near the Tennessee State Fairgrounds in south Nashville, on the former site of Nashville Central High School. According to station officials, WKRN also maintains the original WDCN transmitter and antenna as part of the 1973 arrangement. The original site is now used as Metro's communications center.

WDCN would become the last public television station in the state to be emancipated from a governmental body. WKNO had never been publicly operated, and the state board of education released the remaining stations in the state to community groups back in 1984. Metro formally released WDCN in 2000 to a new board known as "Nashville Public Television". The new board changed the station's calls to WNPT on February 22. Since then, the station has almost never referred to its call letters or channel number on the air (except during legal IDs), usually calling itself "Nashville Public Television".

Local programming
Local shows produced by WNPT include Tennessee Crossroads and Volunteer Gardener.

Technical information

Subchannels
The station's digital signal is multiplexed:

Analog-to-digital conversion
WNPT shut down its analog signal, over VHF channel 8, on June 12, 2009, the official date in which full-power television stations in the United States transitioned from analog to digital broadcasts under federal mandate. The station's digital signal relocated from its pre-transition UHF channel 46 to VHF channel 8 for post-transition operations.

Out-of-market coverage

Northern Alabama 
From the 1970s, up until 1980 at earliest, WDCN (now WNPT), along with the "big three" commercial stations, were carried on cable television in Northern Alabama, including in Florence, Decatur, and Huntsville. This ended as more national cable channels were established throughout the 1980s, and became available to most cable systems. Lincoln County, Tennessee is the only middle Tennessee county in the Huntsville DMA, but Fayetteville Public Utilities, its local cable carrier, carries WNPT instead of the PBS station in its home market, Alabama Public Television's WHIQ-TV.

Southern Kentucky
During much of the 1960s, the Bowling Green, Kentucky area was considered to be within the Nashville DMA (until Nielsen created a market area of its own in 1978). WDCN (now WNPT) was the default PBS outlet for that area, because no other educational television station reached that area with its signal. This ended when WKGB-TV, a broadcast relay station of the Kentucky Educational Television (KET) network based in Lexington, began operations in September 1968. However, even after WKYU-TV started up in that same area in January 1989, WDCN was available on cable in Bowling Green up until about the early 2000s. WNPT's signal can still be received with an outdoor antenna in the city of Bowling Green proper.

In Glasgow, the Glasgow Electric Plant Board still carries WNPT on its system. The South Central Rural Electric Cooperative also carries WNPT on all of its systems, making it available to their customers as far north as Hart, Green and Larue counties, the latter two of which are in the Louisville DMA.

References

External links
Official website

  
     
   

PBS member stations
Television channels and stations established in 1962
NPT (TV)
1962 establishments in Tennessee